Sigma Phi Sigma was a national collegiate fraternity founded in 1908 at the University of Pennsylvania. It ceased operations during WWII and was unable to restart as a national entity, with several chapters joining other fraternities, predominantly Phi Sigma Kappa.

History
Sigma Phi Sigma was founded as a social, academic fraternity at the University of Pennsylvania on 13 April 1908. The Founders were:
Brice Hayden Long
Percy Hollinshed Wood
Guy Park Needham

From the start, leaders cited an early aspiration of national expansion. Efforts were concentrated on formation of chapters at larger institutions, mostly state universities or large private schools.  Some of these chapters entered into successful building projects. By the early 1930s it had achieved a chapter roll of eighteen, what appears to be its high water mark, but there were rumblings that this was insufficient to support its national functions during the Great Depression and WWII. Just four of its chapters re-opened after the war, and due to the fraternity's inability to re-ignite operations elsewhere, the majority of these, and scattered alumni from other chapters, sought new national allegiances.

Demise

The Fraternity's disintegration began as early as 1941, when the University of Maryland chapter withdrew to become a chapter of Sigma Chi.  Cornell's chapter closed that same year, with most of its members joining Tau Kappa Epsilon.

Immediately after the vote to dissolve in 1947, the University of California chapter merged into the re-established Phi Sigma Kappa chapter on that campus, with the provision that any other member of Sigma Phi Sigma from other chapters might also join Phi Sigma Kappa. Following their lead, most of the brothers from the former University of Nevada and University of Wisconsin chapters similarly sought safe harbor in Phi Sigma Kappa, and participated in restoring those chapters as they rebuilt operations. Phi Sigma Kappa's Wisconsin chapter had been dormant since 1931, thus the infusion of new members coming from Sigma Phi Sigma was able to re-start that chapter.

The University of Oregon chapter became a unit of Phi Kappa Psi, and the University of Illinois chapter merged operations with Tau Kappa Epsilon there. One final chapter, at Penn State University, lingered as an independent local for another decade, retaining the name Sigma Phi Sigma. In 1954 it was installed as a charge (~chapter) of Theta Delta Chi.

The 1991 edition of Baird's Manual noted the Society had 4,500 initiates at dissolution.

Chapters
The Fraternity established chapters at eighteen schools. Chapters that accepted some form of merger by the 1947 dissolution are noted in bold, dormant chapters or those with unknown resolution are noted in italics.

Publications and Traditions
The Fraternity published a magazine, called the Sigma Phi Sigma Monad.

Its badge was the three Greek letters of its name, with the Phi superimposed on the two Sigmas. The Phi was set with fifteen pearls, or in some cases, with diamonds.

The fraternity's colors were yellow and white.  Its flowers were Lilies of the Valley and the Jonquil.

The fraternity's song was Come Ye Sons Who Wear the Gold and White.

Government was managed by convention, held biannually.

References

Defunct fraternities and sororities
Student organizations established in 1908
1908 establishments in Pennsylvania